Tucker is a surname of disputed origin.

Possible derivation of the name

The origin of the name is not entirely certain, but since it has a long history as a surname on the continent, as in England and from thereon, also in the United States, it presumably has the same Saxon roots.

In England
Recorded as both Tucker and Tooker, the derivation of the English occupational surname comes from the Old English, pre-7th century verb tucian, meaning "to torment". It would have been for a fuller, also known as a "walker", one who softened freshly woven cloth by beating and tramping on it in water. "Tucker" was the usual term in the southwest of England (and South Wales as well), "walker" in the west and north, and "fuller" in the southeast and East Anglia.

The first recorded spelling of the family name is shown to be that of one Baldwin Tuckere in the 1236 Records of Battle Abbey in Sussex. Nevertheless, one should not be too hasty to assign English origin to bearers of the surname.

German and Dutch origins

Linguistically, the word tucker is assumed to be related to the German tucher, which means "cloth-maker". In the 15th century, the bulk of the German cotton trade was in the hands of the Tucher von Simmelsdorf family in Nürnberg, where Tucher Castle still stands.

In Old Dutch, which is closely related to Old German, the word tuch was often used as a verb to mean "to tug sharply" (see above). The similar linguistic origin of these words is also recognizable in the English etymology.

In the Netherlands the earliest known Tucker's are the brothers Jan and Willam die Tucker, both vassals of the Lord of Culemborg in 1358  who was parented tot the Lord of Breda where Jan Tucker sold a house in 1368 on the Hagedijk Road to Antwerp in the city of Breda. Breda held a local monopoly on the wool trade in those days. Over the centuries the Dutch form of the surname has been spelled both Tucker and Tukker.

Possible Irish origin

Tucker can also be an Anglicized form of the Irish surname O'Tuachair, which first appeared in the Annals of Ulster in 1126 AD as Uá Tuathchair It is not uncommon to see Anglicized representations of Irish surnames, and myriad examples may be cited. According to Patrick Woulfe, in his book Irish Names and Surnames it is the name of two distinct septs; one from the Irish Midlands region known as Ely-O'Carroll (which includes parts of County Tipperary and County Offaly), and another from County Mayo.  These findings were confirmed by the first Chief Herald of Ireland, Edward MacLysaght, and published in his book More Irish Families.

Variants of the Irish surname include Toher, Togher, and Tougher.

People with the surname "Tucker" include

A
Aaron Tucker (born 1981), Canadian writer
Abi Tucker (born 1973), Australian singer-songwriter
Abraham Tucker (1705–1774), English philosopher
Adele Tucker (1868–1971), Bermudian schoolteacher
Adrian Tucker (born 1976), Welsh footballer
Adrian Tucker (cricketer) (born 1969), Australian cricketer
Al Tucker (1943–2001), American basketball player
Alando Tucker (born 1984), American basketball player
Albert Tucker (disambiguation), multiple people
Alexander Tucker (disambiguation), multiple people
Alfred Tucker (1849–1914), Equatorial Guinean bishop
Allen Tucker (1866–1939), American artist
Allen Tucker (Medal of Honor) (1838–1903), American soldier
Amy Tucker (disambiguation), multiple people
Anand Tucker (born 1963), Thai-British filmmaker
Andre Tucker, American football trainer
Andrew Tucker (disambiguation), multiple people
Angela Tucker, American writer
Anna Tucker (1920–2012), American civil servant
Anne Wilkes Tucker, American museum curator
Annette Tucker, American songwriter
Anthony Tucker (disambiguation), multiple people
Archibald Tucker (1904–1980), South African linguist
Arnold Tucker (1924–2019), American football player
Art Tucker (born 1959), American boxer
Avis Tucker (1915–2010), American journalist

B
Barbara Tucker (disambiguation), multiple people
Barry Tucker (born 1952), Welsh footballer
Beatrice Edna Tucker (1897/1898–1984), American obstetrician
Ben Tucker (1930–2013), American bassist
Benjamin Tucker (disambiguation), multiple people
Bernard Tucker (1901–1950), English ornithologist
Bert Tucker (1944–2014), Belizean politician
Bessie Tucker (1906–1933), American singer-songwriter
Beverley D. Tucker (1846–1930), American bishop
Bill Tucker (disambiguation), multiple people
Billy Tucker (born 1948), English footballer
B. J. Tucker (born 1980), American football player
Bobby Tucker (1923–2007), American pianist
Buddy Tucker, American minister
Brad Tucker (born 1992), New Zealand rugby union footballer
Brett Tucker (born 1972), Australian actor
Brett Tucker (cricketer) (born 1979), South African cricketer
Brian Tucker (disambiguation), multiple people
Brooks Tucker, American government official
Bryan Tucker, American comedian

C
Carole Tucker, British professor
Casey Tucker (born 1995), American football player
Catherine Tucker (born 1977), American professor
C. Delores Tucker (1927–2005), American politician and activist
Cécile Tucker (born 1969), American rower
Charles Tucker (disambiguation), multiple people
Charlotte Maria Tucker (1821–1893), English writer
Cheyna Tucker (born 1990), South African squash player
Chris Tucker (born 1972), American actor
Christopher Tucker (1946–2022), British make-up artist
Clarke Tucker (born 1981), American politician
Clay Tucker (born 1980), American basketball player
Cleopatra Tucker (born 1943), American politician
Cliff Tucker (1989–2018), American basketball player
Clifton Tucker (1888–1973), Australian rules footballer
Cole Tucker (born 1996), American baseball player
Cole Tucker (actor) (1953–2015), American actor
Colm Tucker (1952–2012), Irish rugby union footballer
Corin Tucker (born 1972), American singer and guitarist
Curtis R. Tucker (1918–1988), American politician
Cynthia Tucker (born 1955), American columnist
Cynthia Tucker (politician) (born 1954), Canadian politician
Cyril Tucker (1911–1992), English bishop

D
Dakarai Tucker (born 1994), American basketball player
Daniel Tucker (disambiguation), multiple people
Dar Tucker (born 1988), American-Jordanian basketball player
Dara Tucker, American singer-songwriter
Darcy Tucker (born 1975), Canadian hockey player
Darcy Tucker (footballer) (born 1997), Australian rules footballer
Darren Tucker (born 1962), Australian cricketer
David Tucker (disambiguation), multiple people
Deborah Tucker, American actress
Deborah Tucker (executive), American activist
Delmi Tucker (born 1997), South African cricketer
Demetria Tucker, American librarian
Dexter Tucker (born 1979), English footballer
Donald Tucker (disambiguation), multiple people
Dudley Gilman Tucker (1887–1918), American soldier
Duncan Tucker, American filmmaker

E
Earl Snakehips Tucker (1905–1937), American dancer
Ebenezer Tucker (1758–1845), American judge and legislator
Eddie Tucker (born 1966), American baseball player
Eddie Tucker (footballer) (born 1932), Australian rules footballer
Edward Tucker (??–1739), British merchant and politician
Elena J. Tucker, Australian geneticist
E. M. Tucker, American architect
Emma Tucker (born 1966/1967), English journalist
Emmanuel Tucker, Sierra Leonean bishop
Eric Tucker (1932–2018), English painter
Eric James Tucker (1927–1957), Indian army officer
Ethan Tucker, American rabbi
Ethelyn Maria Tucker (1871–1959), American botanist
Eugene A. Tucker (1856–1942), American attorney and politician
Evelyn Tucker (1906–1996), American war hero

F
Forrest Tucker (1919–1986), American actor
Forrest Tucker (criminal) (1920–2004), American criminal
Francis Tucker (1923–2008), South African racing driver
Francis Bland Tucker (1895–1984), American priest
Frank T. Tucker (1864–1910), American politician
Fred C. Tucker (1918–1994), American businessman

G
Gardiner L. Tucker, American scientist
Gee Tucker (born 1946), American actor
George Tucker (disambiguation), multiple people
Gerald Tucker (1922–1979), American basketball coach
Gerard Tucker (1885–1974), Australian priest
Geri Coleman Tucker, American journalist
Gideon J. Tucker (1826–1899), American lawyer and politician
Gil Tucker (born 1947), Australian actor
Glyn Tucker (born 1943), New Zealand musician
Gordon Tucker, American rabbi
Gordon Tucker (footballer) (born 1968), English footballer
Gregory Tucker (born 1957), American politician

H
Harold Tucker (1930–2015), English politician
Harold Logie Tucker (born 1968), Sierra Leonean politician
Hazel Tucker (born 1965), New Zealand anthropologist
Henry Tucker (disambiguation), multiple people
Herman Tucker (1928–2001), American truck driver
H. G. Tucker (1879–1936), American politician
Holly Tucker (born 1977), British entrepreneur
Holly Tucker (musician) (born 1992), American singer-songwriter
Howard Tucker (born 1922), American neurologist
Hugh Tucker (1537–1586), English politician
Hugh Tucker (drag racer), American racing driver

I
Irene Tucker, American philosopher

J
Jack Tucker (born 1999), English footballer
Jacob R. Tucker (1845–1926), American soldier
Jalie Tucker (born 1954), American professor
James Tucker (disambiguation), multiple people
Jane Tucker (born 1949), British actress
Janeiro Tucker (born 1975), Bermudan cricketer
Janine Tucker, American lacrosse coach
Jason Tucker (born 1976), American football player
Jason Tucker (footballer) (born 1973), English footballer
J. E. Tucker (1833–1910), American politician 
Jeff Tucker (luger) (born 1956), American luger
Jeffrey Tucker (born 1963), American writer and publisher
Jennifer Tucker, American professor
Jerry Tucker (disambiguation), multiple people
Jim Tucker (disambiguation), multiple people
Jimmy Tucker (born 1970), English rugby union footballer
Jon Tucker (born 1982), Pipeline Controller and Back-up Specialist
John Tucker (disambiguation), multiple people
Jonathan Tucker (born 1982), American actor
Jonathan B. Tucker (1954–2011), American chemical weapons expert
Joseph Tucker (disambiguation), multiple people
Joshua Tucker (??–1690), English archdeacon
Josiah Tucker (1713–1799), Welsh priest
J. R. Tucker (1946–2014), American physicist
J. Randolph Tucker Jr. (1914–2015), American attorney and politician
Judith Tucker (born 1960), Welsh artist
Judith E. Tucker (born 1947), American professor
Junior Tucker (born 1966), Jamaican musician
Justin Tucker (born 1989), American football player
Jyles Tucker (born 1983), American football player

K
Kane Tucker (born 2000), Irish boxer 
Karla Faye Tucker (1959–1998), American murderer
Kathryn Tucker (born 1959), American attorney
Kathryn Tucker (producer), American film producer
Keith Tucker, American disc jockey
Keith Tucker (footballer) (born 1936), English footballer
Ken Tucker, American media critic
Ken Tucker (footballer) (1925–2008), English footballer
Kenrick Tucker (born 1959), Australian cyclist
Kerrie Tucker (born 1948), Australian politician and activist
Kevin Tucker (disambiguation), multiple people
Kinder Tucker (1875–1939), New Zealand cricketer
Kristina Tucker (born 1980), Swedish golfer
Kwame Tucker (born 1976), Bermudian cricketer
Kyle Tucker (born 1997), American baseball player

L
Lamin Tucker (born 1982), Sierra Leonean sprinter
Larry Tucker (1935–2016), American politician
Larry Tucker (screenwriter) (1934–2001), American television writer
Ledyard Tucker (1910–2004), American mathematician
Lee Tucker (disambiguation), multiple people
Lem Tucker (1938–1991), American journalist
Lew Tucker (born 1950), American computer scientist
Lisa Tucker (disambiguation), multiple people
Liz Tucker, British filmmaker
Lorcan Tucker (born 1996), Irish cricketer
Lorenzo Tucker (1907–1986), American actor
Louise Tucker (born 1956), English soprano
Luther Tucker (1936–1993), American guitarist
Luther Tucker (publisher) (1802–1873), American publisher

M
Malcolm Tucker (disambiguation), multiple people
Marc Tucker (born 1939), American business executive
Marcia Tucker (1940–2006), American art historian
Marcus Tucker (born 1992), American football player
Margaret Tucker (1904–1996), Australian activist
Margaret A. Tucker, American oncologist
Maria Luisa Tucker (born 1979), American journalist
Marianne Tucker (born 1937), British canoeist
Mark Tucker (disambiguation), multiple people
Marlon Tucker (born 1960), Jamaican cricketer
Mary Tucker (disambiguation), multiple people
Matthew Tucker (born 1991), American football player
Maureen Tucker (born 1944), American musician
Maurice Tucker (born 1946), British geologist
Max Tucker (born 1991), Hong Kong cricketer
Mel Tucker (born 1972), American football coach
Michael Tucker (disambiguation), multiple people
Mick Tucker (1947–2002), English musician
Mickey Tucker (born 1941), American pianist
Mike Tucker (disambiguation), multiple people
Milton Tucker (1921–1986), Barbadian sports shooter
Moe Tucker (born 1944), American musician
Mother Grace Tucker (1919–2012), American pastor

N
Nancy Bernkopf Tucker (1948–2012), American diplomat
Nathaniel Beverley Tucker (1784–1851), American author
Nathaniel Beverley Tucker (journalist) (1820–1890), American diplomat
Neely Tucker (born 1963), American journalist
Neil Tucker (1915–1981), Australian rules footballer
Nicholas Tucker, English academic
Nick Tucker (born 1985), American stock car racing driver
Noi Tucker (born 1960), Australian lawn bowler
Norman Tucker (1910–1978), English musician

O
Ollie Tucker (1902–1940), American baseball player
Orrin Tucker (1911–2011), American musician
Otto Tucker (1923–2015), Canadian activist

P
Patty Tucker (born 1954), American bridge player
Paul Tucker (disambiguation), multiple people
Perc Tucker (1919–1980), Australian politician
Percy Tucker (1928–2021), South African author
Peter L. Tucker (1927–2017), Sierra Leonean civil servant
Petrese B. Tucker (born 1951), American judge
Phil Tucker (1927–1985), American filmmaker
P. J. Tucker (born 1985), American basketball player
Pomeroy Tucker (1802–1870), American politician
Preston Tucker (1903–1956), American entrepreneur
Preston Tucker (baseball) (born 1990), American baseball player

R
Rachel Tucker (born 1981), Northern Irish singer and actress
Ralph Tucker (1906–1977), American politician
Ralph Tucker (born 1946), American entrepreneur
Rayjon Tucker (born 1997), American basketball player
Raymond Tucker (1896–1970), American politician
Reuben Tucker (born 1956), Guamanian wrestler
Reuben Henry Tucker III (1911–1970), American army officer
Rex Tucker (1913–1996), British television director
Rex Tucker (American football) (born 1976), American football player
Richard Tucker (disambiguation), multiple people
Robbie Tucker (born 2001), American actor
Robert Tucker (disambiguation), multiple people
Roberto Tucker (born 1983), Argentine footballer
Rod Tucker (born 1964), Australian cricket umpire
Roger Tucker (born 1945), British film director
Rolando Tucker (born 1971), Cuban fencer
Ron Tucker (1921–1986), Australian rules footballer
Rosa Lee Tucker (1866–1946), American librarian
Rosie Tucker, American musician
Rosina Tucker (1881–1987), American labor organizer
Ross Tucker (born 1979), American football player
Roy A. Tucker (born 1951), American astronomer
Russell Tucker (born 1990), South African athlete
Russell E. Tucker (born 1943), American politician
Ryan Tucker (born 1975), American football player
Ryan Tucker (baseball) (born 1986), American baseball player

S
Sam Tucker (1895–1973), English rugby union footballer
Samuel Tucker (disambiguation), multiple people
Sara Tucker, American civil servant
Sarah Tucker (disambiguation), multiple people
Scott Tucker (disambiguation), multiple people
Sean Tucker (disambiguation), multiple people
Seth Brady Tucker (born 1969), American poet
Shankar Tucker (born 1987), American musician
Shelby Tucker (born 1935), American lawyer
Sherrie Tucker (born 1957), American musicologist
Shirley Cotter Tucker (born 1927), American botanist
Shona Tucker, American actress
Shonna Tucker, American musician
S. J. Tucker (born 1980), American singer-songwriter
S. Lane Tucker, American lawyer
Sophie Tucker (1884–1966), singer and comedian
Spencer Tucker (1865–1948), New Zealand cricketer
Spurgeon Tucker (1894–1968), American painter
Stanley Tucker (1931–2008), Canadian pilot
Starling Tucker (1770–1834), American politician
Sterling Tucker (1923–2019), American politician
Steve Tucker (disambiguation), multiple people
St. George Tucker (1752–1827), Bermudan-American judge
Sultan Tucker (born 1978), Liberian athlete
Sundray Tucker (born 1948), American singer
Susan Tucker (disambiguation), multiple people

T
Tamauri Tucker (born 1988), Bermudian cricketer
Tanya Tucker (born 1958), American country musician
Ted Tucker (born 1949), Canadian ice hockey player
Teeny Tucker (born 1958), American singer-songwriter
Temple Tucker (born 1936), American basketball player
Terre Tucker (1944–1990), American model
Therese Tucker (born 1961/1962), American businesswoman
Thomas Tucker (disambiguation), multiple people
Thurman Tucker (1917–1993), American baseball player
Tilghman Tucker (1802–1859), American politician
Timothy Tucker, American pharmacist
T. J. Tucker (born 1978), American baseball player
Todd Tucker (born 1979), American academic
Todd Tucker (director), American film director
Tom Tucker (disambiguation), multiple people
Tony Tucker (born 1958), American boxer
Tony Jaye Tucker Jr. (born 1989), American football player
Torrin Tucker (born 1979), American football player
Travis Tucker (born 1963), American football player
Trent Tucker (born 1959), American basketball player
Tuck Tucker (1961–2020), American writer
Tudor St. George Tucker (1862–1906), English painter
Tui St. George Tucker (1924–2004), American composer and musician
Tyler Tucker (born 2000), Canadian ice hockey player

V
Verran Tucker (born 1988), American football player
Virginia Tucker (1909–1985), American mathematician

W
Wallace Hampton Tucker, American astrophysicist
Walter Tucker (disambiguation), multiple people
Warwick Tucker, Australian mathematician
Wendell Tucker (born 1943), American football player
Whit Tucker (born 1940), Canadian football player
Will Tucker (born 1998), New Zealand rugby union footballer
William Tucker (disambiguation), multiple people
Willis Tucker (1922–2000), American politician
Wilson Tucker (disambiguation), multiple people

Y
Yvonne Edwards Tucker (born 1941), American potter and educator

Fictional characters
 Nina Tucker, character on the Australian soap opera television series Neighbours
 Shou Tucker and his daughter Nina, characters in the Fullmetal Alchemist manga and anime series
 Trip Tucker, character on the television series Star Trek: Enterprise

See also
Tucker (given name), people with the given name "Tucker"
Tuck (surname), people with the surname "Tuck"
Attorney General Tucker (disambiguation), a page for Attorneys General with the surname "Tucker"
General Tucker (disambiguation), a page for Generals with the surname "Tucker"
Governor Tucker (disambiguation), a page for Governors with the surname "Tucker"
Judge Tucker (disambiguation), a page for Judges with the surname "Tucker"
Justice Tucker (disambiguation), a page for Justices with the surname "Tucker"
Senator Tucker (disambiguation), a page for Senators with the surname "Tucker"

References

Occupational surnames
English-language surnames
English-language occupational surnames